Iskhak (İsxaq) is a rural locality (a village) in Novoartaulsky Selsoviet, Yanaulsky District, Bashkortostan, Russia. The population was 12 as of 2010. There is 1 street.

Geography 
Iskhak is located 31 km northwest of Yanaul (the district's administrative centre) by road. Bulat-Yelga is the nearest rural locality.

References 

Rural localities in Yanaulsky District